The following is a list of bike paths in San Diego County.

Paths 

 Bayshore Bikeway: 24-mile bicycle path around the San Diego Bay.
 Camp Pendleton Bike Route in San Diego County: Class 1 while south of the campgrounds at San Onofre State Park.  Class 2/3 elsewhere.
 Fay Avenue Bike Path in La Jolla: Class 1, from Nautilus St to Camino de la Costa
 1-15 Commuter Bikeway This Class I bikeway, which is separated from vehicle traffic, extends from Adams Avenue along a one-mile segment of northbound SR 15 to Camino Del Rio South.
 Mission Bay bike path: near SeaWorld
 Murphy Canyon Road Bike Path: Southbound starts at the south end of Murphy canyon Road and exits in the North East Part of Qualcomm Stadium.
 Ocean Beach Bike Path: Class 1. Runs parallel to the south bank of the San Diego River from Dog Beach to Hotel Circle South in Mission Valley.
 Rose Canyon Bike Path: starts at the Gilman Dr. I-5 exit and ends at Santa Fe Street. It is possible to get to Pacific Beach this way.
 San Luis Rey River bike path: in Oceanside
 Silver Strand bikeway: a.k.a. "Bayshore bikeway", formerly Bayshore bike route, locally known as "Coronado" or "Coronado to Imperial Beach"
 Sweetwater Bikeway: Follows the Sweetwater River from National City to Bonita
 The Hwy 56 Bike Path: Class 1 between I805 and Rancho Penasquitos Road then Class 3 from there to I15

See also

 List of cycleways
 List of Los Angeles bike paths
 List of Orange County bike paths
 California bikeway classifications

References

External links
25 Red Routes in San Diego County
Bike Route Planning w/Map and Elevation change calculated
Bicycle Friendly Community
Rails-to-Trails Conservancy
"sports.dir.groups.yahoo.com Cycling" Yahoo! groups directory
"California Driver Handbook"
"6 SD Paths" Traillink.com's 6 San Diego/North County search results
 "The West's best bike rides" article from Sunset.com
 Locally available information and maps
 Rails to Trails Conservancy compound search page
 California Driver Handbook
 Ridelink's San Diego Region bike maps (detailed, PDF format) can be found at http://www.icommutesd.com/Bike/BikeMap.aspx

 
bike paths